Sleeperstar is an American alternative rock band formed in 2008.

Career
The band released an EP in 2008, To Speak, To Love To Listen followed by their debut album, Just Another Ghost, in 2010 and subsequently secured placements for their music in films and on television, most notably the TV Series Vampire Diaries, as well as the film trailer for the Tom Hanks movie Extremely Loud and Incredibly Close.

They toured the college circuit in 2010–2011, and in 2012 recorded a six-song EP Blue Eyes which was released in January 2013. The began recording their next full-length album. Titled "Lost Machines", it was released in 2014.  The first single, "Lost Without You" was released on March 17, 2014; the second single, "Apocalypse" was released with a music video.

The band continued to tour in support of Blue Eyes and including a stop at SXSW

Discography
To Speak, To Love, To Listen (2008)
Just Another Ghost (2010)
Blue Eyes (2012)
Lost Machines (2014)

References

External links
 

American alternative rock groups